Philipp Zeller (born March 23, 1983 in Munich) is a German field hockey player from Germany and the older brother of Christopher Zeller. He was a member of the Men's National Teams that won the gold medal at the 2008 Summer Olympics, 2012 Summer Olympics and at the 2006 World Cup. As of 2008, his current club is Rot-Weiss Köln.

References
The Official Website of the Beijing 2008 Olympic Games
Official website of the Zeller brothers

External links
 
 
 
 

1983 births
Living people
German male field hockey players
Olympic field hockey players of Germany
Field hockey players at the 2008 Summer Olympics
Olympic gold medalists for Germany
Olympic medalists in field hockey
Field hockey players at the 2012 Summer Olympics
Medalists at the 2012 Summer Olympics
Medalists at the 2008 Summer Olympics
21st-century German people
2006 Men's Hockey World Cup players